Stony Run is a  long 2nd order tributary to Anderson Creek in Clearfield County, Pennsylvania.

Course 
Stony Run rises about 2 miles southeast of Anderson Creek, Pennsylvania, and then flows generally west-northwest to join Anderson Creek about 1.5 miles northeast of Home Camp.

Watershed 
Stony Run drains  of area, receives about 45.5 in/year of precipitation, has a wetness index of 455.06, and is about 78% forested.

See also 
 List of Pennsylvania Rivers

References

Watershed Maps 

Rivers of Pennsylvania
Rivers of Clearfield County, Pennsylvania